Nothobranchius furzeri, the turquoise killifish, is a species of killifish from the family Nothobranchiidae native to Africa where it is only known from Zimbabwe and Mozambique. This annual killifish inhabits ephemeral pools in semi-arid areas with scarce and erratic precipitations and have adapted to the routine drying of their environment by evolving desiccation-resistant eggs that can remain dormant in the dry mud for one and maybe more years by entering into diapause. 

Among vertebrates, the species has the fastest known sexual maturity – only 14 days after hatching. Due to very short duration of the rain season, the natural lifespan of these animals is limited to a few months and their captive lifespan is likewise short. More specifically, they are able to live 1–5 months in the wild (with most only living up to 2 months) and 3 to 16 months in captivity depending on the strain and environment. Turquoise killifish are the shortest-lived vertebrate kept in captivity making them an attractive model system for ageing and disease research. Tandem repeats comprise 21% of the species' genome, an abnormally high proportion, which has been suggested as a factor in its fast ageing. Their captive diet consists mostly bloodworms and there are current efforts to replace bloodworms by pelleted diets.

The species name is derived from that of the discoverer Richard E. Furzer of Rhodesia.

References

External links 

 Nothobranchius furzeri on WildNothos - various information and photographs of this species

 NCBI taxonomy database
 NFIN - The Nothobranchius furzeri Information Network
 In Short-Lived Fish, Secrets to Aging (Carl Zimmer, New York Times)
 Nothobranchius furzeri in ageing research
 Maintenance, breeding & conservation of killifish
 Nothobranchius furzeri information
 Prachtgrundkärpflinge (German)

furzeri
Fish of Mozambique
Fish of Zimbabwe
Fish described in 1971